The Bröl (also called the Brölbach or the Homburgische Bröl) is a 45.1 km long right tributary of the Sieg in North Rhine-Westphalia, Germany.

The river flows through the districts of Rhein-Sieg-Kreis and Oberbergischer Kreis. The river's source is in the town of Waldbröl at an elevation of 368 meters above sea level. It flows in a southwest direction through the Bergisches Land and past the Homburg Castle. In the town of Ruppichteroth, a small tributary called the Waldbrölbach joins the Bröl. It eventually flows to the town of Hennef where it joins the Sieg at an elevation of 67 meters.

References

Rivers of North Rhine-Westphalia
Rivers of Germany